Hajjiabad (also Romanized as Ḩājjīābād and Hājīābād) is a village in Haram Rud-e Olya Rural District, in the Central District of Malayer County, Hamadan Province, Iran.

Demographics 
At the 2006 census, its population was 1,354, in 353 families.

References 

Populated places in Malayer County